Suad Beširević (4 March 1963 – 28 September 2019) was a Slovene football manager and a professional football player.

Playing career

Club
He was regarded as one of the best players of FK Borac Banja Luka, where he spent most of his career and where he won the 1987–88 Yugoslav Cup. He also won the 1990–91 Cypriot First Division and the 1991–92 Cypriot Cup with Apollon Limassol FC. He was the joint top goalscorer of the 1990–91 Cypriot First Division season alongside Panikos Xiourouppas, with 19 scored goals in 25 played games.

Managerial career
As a manager Beširević won the Slovenian Cup in the 2002–03 season with NK Olimpija Ljubljana, whose manager he was from January 2003 to the summer of 2004. He also won the Slovenian Third League (West Group) with NK Šenčur in the 2008–09 season.

Personal life
On 27 September 2019, Beširević died at the age of 56 after a long illness in his hometown of Ljubljana.

Honours

Player

Club
Borac Banja Luka
Yugoslav Cup: 1987–88

Apollon Limassol
Cypriot First Division: 1990–91
Cypriot Cup: 1991–92

Individual
Performance
Cypriot First Division Top Goalscorer: 1990–91 (19 goals)

Manager
Olimpija Ljubljana
Slovenian Cup: 2002–03

Šenčur
Slovenian Third League - West: 2008–09

References

External links
 Interview at boracbl.net

1963 births
2019 deaths
Footballers from Ljubljana
Association football forwards
Yugoslav footballers
Slovenian footballers
NK Svoboda Ljubljana players
FK Borac Banja Luka players
HNK Rijeka players
Apollon Limassol FC players
NK Celje players
APEP FC players
Aris Limassol FC players
Omonia Aradippou players
Yugoslav First League players
Yugoslav Second League players
Cypriot First Division players
Slovenian expatriate footballers
Expatriate footballers in Cyprus
Slovenian expatriate sportspeople in Cyprus
Slovenian football managers
NK Ljubljana managers
NK Olimpija Ljubljana (1945–2005) managers